Morgen fällt die Schule aus is a 1971 West German comedy film directed by Werner Jacobs and starring Heintje Simons, Hansi Kraus and Rudolf Schündler. It was the sixth in the Die Lümmel von der ersten Bank series of comedy films.

Cast
 Heintje Simons: Pit van Dongen
 Hansi Kraus: Pepe Nietnagel
 Theo Lingen: Headmaster Dr. Taft
 Rudolf Schündler: Teacher Dr. Knörz
 Ralf Wolter: Teacher Dr. Geis
 Fritz Tillmann: Kurt Nietnagel
 Heinz Reincke: Mr. van Dongen
 Hans Terofal: Pedell Georg Bloch
 Balduin Baas: Teacher Dr. Blaumeier
 Eva Maria Meineke: Mrs Dr. Knörz
 Monika Dahlberg: Mrs. Schmitz
 Evelyn Opela: Fräulein Dr. Lang
 Franz Muxeneder: Sergeant
 Carola Höhn: Mrs. Nietnagel
 Charlotte Witthauer: Mrs. Taft
 Hugo Lindinger: Hunter
 Jutta Speidel: Lydia Meier
 Otto Vogler: Herr Vogler
 Gerhard Acktun: Student
 Josef Moosholzer: Teacher
 Marc Nissimoff: Teacher
 Franz Seitz: Briefmarkenhändler

External links
 

1971 films
1971 comedy films
German comedy films
West German films
1970s German-language films
Films directed by Werner Jacobs
Films about educators
1970s German films